Jaroslav Skobla (16 April 1899 – 22 November 1959) was a Czechoslovakian weightlifter. After winning a world light-heavyweight title in 1923 he was a favorite at the 1924 Olympics, but finished in a mere eighth place. Skobla then moved to the heavyweight category and won a bronze and a gold medal at the 1928 and 1932 Games, respectively. He worked as an accountant, buncer, policeman. His frends collected money to send him to the games.

His son Jiří was an Olympic shot put competitor.

References

1899 births
1959 deaths
Sportspeople from Prague
Weightlifters at the 1924 Summer Olympics
Weightlifters at the 1928 Summer Olympics
Weightlifters at the 1932 Summer Olympics
Olympic gold medalists for Czechoslovakia
Olympic bronze medalists for Czechoslovakia
Olympic medalists in weightlifting
Czechoslovak male weightlifters
Medalists at the 1932 Summer Olympics
Medalists at the 1928 Summer Olympics